The county of Lincolnshire is divided into nine districts. The districts of Lincolnshire are Lincoln, North Kesteven, South Kesteven, South Holland, Boston, East Lindsey, West Lindsey, North Lincolnshire, and North East Lincolnshire.

As there are 440 Grade I listed buildings in the county they have been split into separate lists for each district.

 Grade I listed buildings in Lincoln
 Grade I listed buildings in North Kesteven
 Grade I listed buildings in South Kesteven
 Grade I listed buildings in South Holland
 Grade I listed buildings in Boston (borough)
 Grade I listed buildings in East Lindsey
 Grade I listed buildings in West Lindsey
 Grade I listed buildings in North Lincolnshire
 Grade I listed buildings in North East Lincolnshire

See also
 Grade II* listed buildings in Lincolnshire